Stephen Graham Mold (born January 1968) is an English politician, and the current Police, Fire and Crime Commissioner for Northamptonshire, representing the Conservative Party. He was elected to the post on 5 May 2016, succeeding the previous incumbent, Adam Simmonds. He was re-elected in 2021.

References

1968 births
Living people
Police and crime commissioners in England
Conservative Party police and crime commissioners